Paths of the Soul (gangs rin po che) is a 2015 Chinese film directed, written, and produced by Zhang Yang.   It tells of a journey taken by Tibetan villagers on a 1,200 kilometer pilgrimage to Lhasa.

The film premiered at the 2015 Toronto International Film Festival. It was subsequently presented at the 2015 Busan International Film Festival, 2016 Vilnius International Film Festival, 2016 Hong Kong International Film Festival, 2016 Goteborg International Film Festival, 2016 Rotterdam International Film Festival, and the 2016 Seattle International Film Festival, among others.

The film was given a limited release in North America on 13 May 2016.  It was also shown at the Museum of Modern Art in New York City from May 13 to May 19, 2016.

The film was released in China on 20 June 2017.

Reception
Carried by positive reviews and audience reaction, the film has grossed  in China, and became a surprise art house box office hit. It has a 90/100 average on Metacritic.

Awards and nominations

References

External links

Paths of the Soul at the San Francisco Film Society

Chinese drama films
Films about Tibet
Tibetan-language films
Films directed by Zhang Yang